The Women's snowboard halfpipe competition at the FIS Freestyle Ski and Snowboarding World Championships 2019 was held on February 6 and 8, 2019.

Qualification
The qualification was started on February 6, at 12:00. The eight best snowboarders qualify for the final.

Final
The final was started at 19:00.

References

Women's snowboard halfpipe